Victory Live! is the third American gospel music album released by Tye Tribbett & Greater Anointing on Columbia Records in 2006. Recorded on Saturday, December 3, 2005 at Philadelphia's Deliverance Evangelistic Church, the album features guest appearances from Mary Mary, Hezekiah Walker, Donnie McClurkin, Kim Burrell and Israel Houghton.

Track listing

Personnel
Lead vocals
Tye Tribbett
Kim Burrell on Everything Will Be Alright (Reprise)
Demaris Tribbett on Seated at the Right Hand of God
Aaron Camper and Angela White on G.A. Hymn (Who Else But God)
Thaddaeus Tribbett on No Other Choice

Greater Anointing
Sopranos: Demaris Tribbett, Dania Daniels, Carolyn Benjamin, Candace Felder, Shukriyyah "Peachie" Parham, Shaylah Stevens, Shannon Murray
Tenors: Aaron Camper, Timothy Neil Kennedy, Darnell Parham, Jerome White, Lionel Brown
Altos: Shanté Tribbett, Angela White, Deanna Moore, Dionne Bowens, Kimberly Tribbett, Daneen Parham

SoundCheck (Band)
Keyboards: Parris "Diddy" Bowens
Organ/Keyboards: Dana "C-Bazz" Sorey
Drums: George "Spanky" McCurdy
Percussion: Leonard "Pudge" Tribbett
Bass Guitar: Thaddaeus Tribbett
Lead Guitar: Darnell Miller
Trumpet: Christopher "Chris" Stevens
Trumpet: Theljon Allen
Alto Sax: Danté Felder
Tenor Sax: Jeffrey Jones
Trombone: Curtis Jones
Flute: Delandria Mills

Technical credits
Thom Cadley, Engineer
James Poyser, Executive Producer
Erwin Gorostiza, Art Direction
James Cruz, Mastering
Dana Sorey, Producer
Ryan Moys, Overdub engineer
Fusako Chubachi, Art Direction
Chauncey Childs, Executive Producer

Charts

References

2006 live albums